The William G. Ponder Plantation was a large cotton plantation of over  situated in northeastern Leon County, Florida, United States and established by William G. Ponder.

Location
The plantation was located west of the settlement of Miccosukee and not bordering any other plantations. Today that land encompasses private property north of Moccasin Gap Road and Veteran's Memorial Drive.

Plantation statistics
The Leon County Florida 1860 Agricultural Census shows that the William G. Ponder Plantation had the following:
Improved Land: 
Unimproved Land: 
Cash value of plantation: $48,000
Cash value of farm implements/machinery: $1500
Cash value of farm animals: $6,125
Number of slaves: 99
Bushels of corn: 8,500 
Bales of cotton: 206

The owner
G.W. Ponder was one of two absentee planters in northeast Leon County. Originally from Thomas County, Georgia, Ponder began purchasing land in Leon County in 1846.

Agents for William Ponder.
B. Regan
Jno. J. Courtney

The 1900s 
In 1913, the W.G. Ponder Plantation grounds were purchased by Lewis S. Thompson of Red Bank, New Jersey renaming it Sunny Hill Plantation.

References
Wealth of land owners
Slave holders
Paisley, Clifton; From Cotton To Quail, University of Florida Press, c1968.

Plantations in Leon County, Florida
Cotton plantations in Florida